Strætó bs is a public transport company which operates city buses in the Icelandic capital, Reykjavík, and surrounding satellite towns and suburbs. The buses are bright yellow and are commonly called "Strætó" by the locals, a shortened nickname for "strætisvagn" (urban bus, literally "street carriage"). Strætó bs started operations on 1 July 2001 with the merger of SVR (Strætisvagnar Reykjavíkur) and AV (Almenningsvagnar). SVR previously operated in Reykjavík and nearby satellites in the northern part of the Capital Region, while AV covered the southern part of the region. Strætó bs is owned and run by the seven municipalities in the region: Reykjavík, Kópavogur, Hafnarfjörður, Garðabær, Mosfellsbær, Seltjarnarnes and Álftanes.

Bus network 
Most buses run at about 15-minute intervals during peak hours on weekdays and in 30-minute intervals during off-peak hours and weekends. There are 30 routes, 6 of which are trunk routes (red routes 1–6) that run between the main terminal at Hlemmur and the various residential neighbourhoods on the city's outskirts; these use the main traffic arteries and are thus the fastest routes available. Nine of the routes are general routes (green routes 11–19) that also stop at Hlemmur terminal but go deeper into the different neighborhoods on slower streets. The remaining 15 routes are neighborhood routes (blue routes 21–24, 26–28 and 33–35) that run within or between the suburbs and do not stop in downtown Reykjavík. Bus routes 51, 52, 57, 71, 72, 73 are long-distance routes that run to towns in Vesturland (West Iceland) and Suðurland (South Iceland).

The buses operate from nine terminals in the Capital Region. The main terminals are Hlemmur and Lækjartorg in downtown Reykjavík; the others are at Hamraborg in Kópavogur, Fjörður in Hafnarfjörður, Ásgarður in Garðabær, Ártún, Mjódd, Spöngin in Reykjavík and Háholt in Mosfellsbær. All of these main bus terminals are served by at least one red (trunk) route.

Route overview 

Notes:
Route does not start until noon on Sundays
Route frequency is reduced on weekends and in the evenings, as well during summertime.
Route 23: Taxi services on late evenings and Sundays.
Route 33/34 are circle lines. 33 runs clockwise, 34 counter-clockwise.
Route 27: Taxi service on this route: The bus has to be called at least 60 min before departure.
Route 43/44: Lines take over from routes 33/34 on weekdays after noon and on weekends.

Overland buses 

Notes:
Route 51: extra school buses between Selfoss, Hella and Hvolsvöllur on schooldays
Route 52: The morning trip from Reykjavík starts at BSÍ, the second one from Mjódd only. If there is no ship from Landeyjahöfn to the Westman Islands, the bus will terminate at Hvolsvöllur.
Route 72/73: These are circular routes. Route 72 goes clockwise and 73 counter-clockwise.

* Routes 83, 84 and 85 only operate after a reservation via phone.

Night bus 
For Culture Night on Sat 20 August 2016, Strætó offered free night-buses which ran from 23:00 to 01:00. The first regular night bus service in Reykjavík began in January 2018 on a year-long trial basis. The service consisted of six routes (101, 102, 103, 105, 106, and 111) which started at the central bus station Hlemmur running out to the suburbs. These six night-bus routes operated only at weekends and between the hours of 00:00 and 04:30 departing on an hourly basis. The buses took passengers to all the major neighbourhoods in Reykjavík, but wouldn't take any passengers on their return journey to the centre. Fares on the night bus cost ISK 940 per person, compared to the daytime bus fare of ISK 470 at the time. In October 2018 Strætó announced that night bus usage had been too low in the preceding ten months with only routes 101 and 106 having shown an acceptable level of ridership during that time. Strætó director Jóhannes Rúnarsson said that he’d "hoped to see more people using the night service". Route 111 was discontinued in January 2019 while the remaining five were kept on until 31 March 2020 when all night buses in Reykjavík were suspended until further notice as a result of the COVID-19 pandemic.

In July 2022, Strætó resumed the night service, adding two new routes that had not existed before services were paused in March 2020. The previous routes of the 101, 102, 103, 105 and 106 were re-instated as well as two new routes named the 104 and 107. The new route named 107 follows much the same route as route 111 which was discontinued in January 2019. As before, the night buses leave from Reykjavík city center on Friday and Saturday nights only, and can only be used travelling from the city centre to the suburbs, not from the suburbs towards the city centre. Prices were also reduced, meaning that customers who use Strætó's fare medias, like Klapp card, Klapp app, Klapp ten, Bus card or Strætó app pay the same fare that is used during the day (490 kr). Customers who want to pay with debit/credit cards or cash need to pay a premium fare of 1,000 kr. however.

Tickets and fares 
The standard fare for a single ticket within the capital region of Rekyjavik in 2022 is ISK 550 for adults but discounts of 50% are available for children, senior citizens and disabled people. Children under 11 ride free on these services. Tickets have a timer of 75 minutes from the first activation, allowing multiple bus trips to be boarded in the time window. Tickets are bought via the Strætó app for single and group tickets or via the KLAPP app.

Single fare stubs and 10 ticket stubs can be bought at convenience stores like '10-11'  valid only on the capital region bus service. This excludes countryside services which are done mainly via cash and  contactless payment methods (Google Pay, Apple Pay, contactless banking). These services can vary in price dependant on the zone that a person is travelling to. Cost is ISK 550 per zone travelled through to destination.

Network renewal and development 
On 23 July 2005, a new route network was instituted to replace the previous network, which had been used practically unchanged for decades. New routes had been added in new-developing areas, but the core routes were largely untouched until 2005. Planning for the revised network began in 2001. Its greatest change was introduction of the 'trunk routes' and their increased frequency during peak hours. Unfortunately, the introduction of the new network caused a great deal of controversy and confusion as people (especially senior citizens, who make up a large percentage of those who actually use the service) had gotten used to the old routes. Additionally, some smaller neighbourhoods were entirely cut out of the routes, resulting in long walks to the nearest bus station. The controversy seems to have died down, and in fact complaints have arisen every time the system has been changed in the past.

On 5 March 2006, some refinements were made to the network in response to comments from users and drivers after the 2005 revision. The greatest change was the addition of 3 routes to better cover some neighborhoods and increase interlinking between areas.

In 2010, a new green line 16 was added to provide a bus at every 15 minutes between Hlemmur and Nauthóll. Also, the course of route 18 was changed, it now terminates at Grafarholt instead of going through to Spöngin. Transportation service is provided by the new blue line 26 by connecting Spöngin and Hraunsás. For both lines, a new stop 'Mímisbrunnur v/Úlfarsbraut' was added. In late summer, there were other changes: Lines 31/32 that used to go through the area around Spöngin (terminus of Route 6) were cancelled. Instead of these two circular routes, line 6 now goes through Borgir, Víkur and Barðastaðir and back to Spöngin for an increased frequency in Borgir, Víkur and Barðastaðir but cutting Hamrar and Rimar from the network. During weekends and late evenings, buses drive from Barðastaðir down to Grafarholt where they serve the new extended Grafarholt area and then head back to Barðastaðir and Spöngin. Also, the route of line 22 was changed for the evenings: It now runs via Álfaskleið instead of serving Skútuhraun/Slökkviðstöð back to Fjörður terminal so an hourly service in central Hafnarfjörður can be provided.

In 2011, Strætó bs. decreased the amount of bus rides per day. Routes 2 and 5 run on weekdays only, stopping already at 6pm. In general, operating hours have been cut: Instead of midnight, buses stop operating at about 11:30 pm. The last routes now terminate at about 11:30 pm. Route 36 was abandoned and 35 now runs in a 30 minutes interval all day.

But there has also been expansion: Service on lines 23 and 28 has been improved. Although the Vífilsstaðir branch of line 23 has been abandoned, the frequency of buses to Álftanes is now every 30 minutes during rush hours and every 60 minutes during the rest of the day. On Sundays, there is a taxi service several times a day to Álftanes and one late night bus is available as taxi service all days of the week from Ásgarður.

Route 28 was expanded to meet the demands of residents from the Vatnsendi area. Instead of having to take the 30 minutes ride to Hamraborg/Kópavorgur, the bus runs now to Mjódd as well so that travelling times from Vatnsendi to connecting trunk routes have been cut by twenty minutes.

In early 2012, bus services in Southern Iceland (Suðurland) were extended. Apart from the bus services from Mjódd to Selfoss and Hveragerði, one can now take buses to Þorlákshöfn, the Laugarvatn area, Vík í Mýrdal/Skógar, Skaftafell and Höfn í Hornafirði in southern Iceland.

As of 2017, there are plans to convert the main corridors into separated fast-lanes, so called Borgarlína, with the first segments expected to open in the 2020s.

References

External links 
  
  
About Strætó bs 

Public transport in Iceland
Bus companies of Iceland
Transport in Reykjavík